Tek Fog is an alleged mobile phone software application supposedly used by the India's Bharatiya Janata Party (BJP). It was first purported by Indian news and opinion website The Wire, who has since suspended, and later formally retracted the story, due to cooked up stories and alleged discrepancies in the material used. The Wire also issued a formal apology to its readers and asked for a formal donation.

Initial investigation 

Alerted by a disgruntled employee-turned-whistleblower, the independent Indian news publication The Wire conducted a two-year investigation and published its findings in January 2022. This report claimed that the Tek Fog application was used "to artificially inflate the popularity of the Bharatiya Janata Party, harass its critics and manipulate public perceptions at scale across major social media platforms" and to "amplify right-wing propaganda".

The Wire investigation also claimed the BJP, along with the private companies Persistent Systems and Mohalla Tech (which operates a service called ShareChat), were involved in deploying the app. The BJP's youth wing (BJYM) members were said to have supervised the operators, giving them ideological directions. The investigation also claimed that an unnamed internal source within Persistent Systems found 17,000 files connected to Tek Fog developed by Persistent Systems.

In January 2022, Devang Dave, head of BJYM IT Cell, denied that he or anyone from his organisation knew about such an app. Persistent Systems and Mohalla Tech denied any involvement with each other or with Tek Fog. BJP youth wing functionary Devang Dave, who was claimed to have supervised the operation, denied the party's involvement.

On October 23, 2022, The Wire removed its Tek Fog investigation from its website, "pending the outcome of an internal review". The Wire has accused one of the story's authors of "deception" in a separate series of articles on Meta.

Claimed features

The Wire's report described the app as being capable of several actions. These capabilities purportedly included being able to hijack the '"trending"' section of social media sites, Twitter and Facebook, bulk-hacking of inactive Whatsapp accounts, among other functionalities.

Other features supposedly included promoting favourable viewpoints through misinformation targeting users perceived to be BJP party opponents. Tek Fog was also alleged to have managed a huge database of Indian citizens which included specific data regarding their occupation, religion, age, gender, etc., which was then used to deliver targeted insults and criticism.

Alleged victims
The Delhi Union of Journalists (DUJ) released a statement condemning the app stating that women journalists were "prime targets of the app" and noting that The Wire investigation listed several women journalists who received up to one million abusive tweets between January and May 2021, including Rana Ayyub, Barkha Dutt, Nidhi Razdan, Rohini Singh, Swati Chaturvedi, Sagarika Ghose, Manisha Pande, Faye D'Souza, Arfa Khanum Sherwani and Smita Prakash.

On 9 January, journalist Arfa Khanum Sherwani released a list of prominent women from several religions including Hinduism who were targeted and harassed by hackers using Tek Fog.

Reactions
The Editors Guild of India, a national non-profit organisation of journalists, said that The Wire investigation "laid bare an extensive and well funded network built around an app, Tek Fog, which steals unused WhatsApp accounts to send out toxic messages to targeted journalists", highlighting the abuse received by women journalists and noting that "the purpose of these deeply hurtful messages was to instil fear in them". The Editors Guild condemned "the continuing online harassment of women journalists, which includes targeted and organised online trolling as well as threats of sexual abuse", and demanded "urgent steps to break and dismantle this misogynistic and abusive digital eco-system". The Guild has since retracted its statements, after The Wire took down the original articles. That retraction cited concerns over the report's accuracy and insufficient "journalistic norms and checks".

Opposition parties denounced the app as a national security threat and demanded a probe. Rajya Sabha MP Derek O'Brien (of the Trinamool Congress) called for a meeting of the Parliamentary Standing Committee on Home Affairs to discuss the app and said it "has serious ramifications and could jeopardise national security."

The primary opposition party, Indian National Congress called Tek Fog, "a poisonous weapon of the BJP's propaganda machinery, which is harmful to the country" and urged the Supreme Court to ask its expert panel to investigate the app. Congress spokesperson Supriya Shrinate held a press conference on the issue in which she "urged the Supreme Court to look into this and to punish, in no uncertain terms, the people who are behind this". Shrinate said that the app "targets Indian citizens and hurts the very foundation of our democracy." Congress leader Rahul Gandhi called the app one of several "factories of hate" set up by the BJP.

There were also multiple calls for the Supreme Court to intervene in this matter. Congress wanted the Supreme Court to get the issue examined by the expert panel that was looking into the alleged use of the Pegasus spyware on Indian citizens. The Editors Guild of India and Delhi Union of Journalists (DUJ), in their statements, also called for a Supreme Court inquiry.

The Minister of State for Home in the Maharashtra government, Satej Patil, questioned the silence of the Government of India and Information and Technology ministry over the Tek Fog expose. Patil demanded that the Union government should take cognisance of the issue. He made a public appeal to the victims from Mumbai targeted by Tek Fog app to register a police complaint, after which Maharashtra Police and Cyber Crime Investigation Cell will investigate the case.

Journalist Zarrar Khuhro wrote in Pakistani newspaper Dawn that Tek Fog "was used in many underhanded ways to promote the hateful Hindutva ideology". French newspaper Le Monde commented that it is perhaps the most elaborate online political manipulation operation ever discovered.

Anand Venkatnarayanan, an Indian internet security researcher, called the app a military-grade psychological operations weapon. He claimed that the capabilities that are part of Tek Fog had only been accessible to state actors, and that putting it in the hands of non-state actors affiliated to a political party "had never been done before".

Investigation by Parliamentary Standing Committee on Home Affairs 
On 12 January 2022, The Hindu reported that Anand Sharma, the head of the Parliamentary Standing Committee on Home Affairs, wrote to the Ministry of Home Affairs of the Government of India seeking a response on questions surrounding Tek Fog. They directed the Ministry to co-ordinate with other ministries, and provide information on the app and its use by 20 January 2022.

The investigation was initiated after several calls for the Standing Committee to investigate Tek Fog. Chairman Sharma was reported to have taken note of the matter, stating that it may be discussed in the next meeting of the Parliamentary Panel on Home Affairs. On 10 January, O'Brien wrote a second letter to convene a meeting to discuss Tek Fog. He wrote that the app provided an ability to hijack the WhatsApp accounts of citizens using spyware and use their inactive contacts of the hijacked number, which were uploaded to a database, to send mass messages. The letter also pointed out that this hacking technique was formerly used by the Pegasus spyware before the NSO Group developed an even more sophisticated zero-click hijacking method. The application, per O'Brien, could send automated messages, spread misinformation, fake news and mislead citizens.

On 12 January, Congress leader and leader of the opposition in the Lok Sabha Adhir Ranjan Chowdhury also wrote to the chairman of the Parliamentary Standing Committee on Home Affairs, Anand Sharma, asking the committee discuss the "violative software application Tek Fog" in their next meeting.

The Parliamentary Standing Committee asked the Union Home Ministry to provide information about the Tek Fog app. On 12 February, responding to the request, Minister of State for Electronics and Information Technology Rajeev Chandrasekhar stated, "The ministry has searched for the app on all prominent app stores and APK stores and could not find so called app in any of these online stores."

Retraction and apology 
On 23 October 2022, The Wire took down its Tek Fog story as it was found that the app never existed and the journalist who carried out this investigation presented forged documents and emails to defame Amit Malviya(BJP IT Cell Head). On further investigation on the background of the journalist it was found that he had fabricated many more stories like the "Tek Fog" one to spread disinformation and mislead public. The Wire also issued a formal apology to its readers.

See also
 Pegasus Project revelations in India
 The Wire (India)#Litigation

References

Bharatiya Janata Party
Cyberbullying
Disinformation
Internet manipulation and propaganda